Appetein or APC-Appetein is a processed granulated plasma and serum blend ingredient for animal feeds, mostly used for young animals. The appetein name is a patented, belongs to the company APC.

See also
 Compound feed

References
 www.functionalproteins.com
 www.susonline.de

External links 
 APC, Inc. (USA)
 APC-Appetein product page (USA)
 APC-Appetein product page (Canada/French)

Fodder